Cochylimorpha conankinensis is a species of moth of the family Tortricidae. It is found in China (Gansu, Shaanxi, Sichuan).

References

 

C
Moths of Asia
Endemic fauna of China
Moths described in 1992